Sage Hen Valley is a valley in the U.S. state of Nevada.

Sage Hen Valley was named for the sage hens which once roamed the valley. A variant name is "Sagehen Valley".

References

Valleys of Churchill County, Nevada
Valleys of Pershing County, Nevada